Muscel or Mușcel may refer to several places in Romania:

 Câmpulung, also called Câmpulung-Muscel, a city in Argeș County
 Mușcel, a village in Boteni Commune, Argeș County
 Mușcel, a village in the town of Pătârlagele, Buzău County
 Muscel, a village in Viperești Commune, Buzău County
 Mușcel, a village in Moroeni Commune, Dâmbovița County
 Muscel County, a historic county of Romania
 Mușcel (river) in Dâmbovița County